

2017

Notes

Seasons in Chilean football
2016–17 in Chilean football
2017–18 in Chilean football